These are the results of the 2021 NACAC U23 Championships in Athletics which took place on July 9, 10, and 11, at the Estadio Nacional in San José, Costa Rica.

Men's results

100 meters

Heats – July 9Wind:Heat 1: +0.6 m/s, Heat 2: +4.1 m/s

Final – July 9

Wind: +0.2 m/s

200 meters

Heats – July 10Wind:Heat 1: -0.6 m/s, Heat 2: -0.2 m/s

Final – July 11

Wind: -1.7 m/s

400 meters
July 10

800 meters
July 10

1500 meters
July 11

5000 meters
July 9

110 meters hurdles
July 10Wind: -1.5 m/s

400 meters hurdles
July 9

3000 meters steeplechase
July 11

4 × 100 meters relay
July 10

10,000 meters walk
July 10

High jump
July 11

Pole vault
July 11

Long jump
July 11

Triple jump
July 9

Shot put
July 9

Discus throw
July 9

Hammer throw
July 10

Javelin throw
July 10

Decathlon
July 9–10

Women's results

100 meters
July 9Wind: +0.6 m/s

200 meters
July 11Wind: -1.6 m/s

400 meters
July 10

800 meters
July 10

100 meters hurdles
July 10Wind: -2.6 m/s

400 meters hurdles
July 9

5000 meters walk
July 10

High jump
July 9

Triple jump
July 11

Shot put
July 9

Discus throw
July 9

Hammer throw
July 10

Javelin throw
July 11

Heptathlon
July 9–10

Mixed results

4 × 100 meters relay
July 11

References

NACAC Under-23 Championships in Athletics
Events at the NACAC Under-23 Championships in Athletics